The Indians Are Coming is a 1930 American Pre-Code
Universal movie serial based on The Great West That Was by William "Buffalo Bill" Cody. The serial was the first "all-talking" (complete sound rather than a silent movie with occasional sound sections) film of its kind.  It played at The Roxy Theatre and was responsible for saving the film serial format into the sound era.

Plot
Jack Manning (Tim McCoy) arrives in town from Gold Creek, California. He brings a message from George Woods (Francis Ford) to George's brother Tom Woods (Francis Ford in a dual role), and his niece Mary (Allene Ray), informing them he has struck gold and asking them to travel to California via a wagon train to be with him. Jack and Mary fall in love much to the displeasure of Rance Carter (Wilbur McGaugh), who has a yen for Mary himself. Carter causes the local Indians to go on the warpath in an attempt to break up Jack and Mary's wedding plans.

Cast
 Tim McCoy as Jack Manning 
 Allene Ray as Mary Woods 
 Francis Ford in a dual role as George Woods/ Tom Woods 
 Wilbur McGaugh (billed as Don Francis) as Rance Carter, the villain 
 Edmund Cobb as Bill Williams 
 Bud Osborne as Bull McGee

Production
Along with a sequel Battling with Buffalo Bill (1931), this serial was based on a book called The Great West That Was by William "Buffalo Bill" Cody. Henry MacRae was the director.

Release

Theatrical
The release of The Indians Are Coming was the first time a serial was given an "uptown" treatment. The serial played at The Roxy in New York City and had full runs across the country.

According to Raymond Stedman, The Indians Are Coming earned a profit on "near" $1M. The success of the serial ended doom-mongering about the sound technology being the end of the serial format. It is "credited with reviving interest in what seemed to be a dying form of entertainment" and proved that action sequences could still be done with sound equipment.

Critical reception
Stedman compares Tim McCoy's delivery to that of Adam West in the Batman television series but declares it restrained compared to other stars.  He goes on to comment that "Only the dog managed not to fall victim to the natural tendency of actors groomed in the silent film to overplay when thrust into a talkie."

Chapter titles
 Pals in Buckskin
 A Call to Arms
 A Furnace of Fear
 The Red Terror
 The Circle of Death
 Hate's Harvest
 Hostages of Fear
 The Dagger Duel
 The Blast of Death
 Redskin's Vengeance
 Frontiers Aflame
 The Trail's End
Source:

See also
 List of American films of 1930
 List of film serials by year
 List of film serials by studio

References

External links

1930 films
Universal Pictures film serials
American black-and-white films
1930 Western (genre) films
1930s English-language films
Films directed by Henry MacRae
American Western (genre) films
1930s American films